Alberto Ullastres (15 January 1914 – 15 November 2001) was Spain's minister of economy (1957-1965) and ambassador to the European Economic Community (1965-1976) under General Franco. He pushed forward the so-called Stabilization Plan which brought about Spain's transition from economic autarchy to liberalization and internationalization of the national economy, an economic success which has been called the Spanish miracle. Ullastres was part of the so-called "Opusdeistas" – ministers under Franco who were also members of the Opus Dei organisation.

Life
He was born in Madrid on 15 January 1914 and died in Madrid on 15 November 2001. 

He studied law and commerce. He obtained a doctorate in law from the University of Madrid. He was university professor (catedratico) for political economy.

Economic studies and work
Because of the so-called Spanish miracle, which has been attributed to him and the other Spanish technocrats, Ullastres has been counted among the "great economists". He studied the economic doctrines of the School of Salamanca of the 16th and 17th centuries, especially the doctrine of Juan de Mariana and of Martín de Azpilcueta.

In an article "The Awakening Land", Time magazine attributed Spain's economic modernization to him: "On a hot July day in 1959, Ullastres announced a sweeping stabilization plan. Credit was tightened, the budget slashed, the peseta devalued to a realistic 60 to the dollar. With the aid of a $400 million international loan, Ullastres threw open Spain's doors to imports necessary to rebuild its economy. And over the howls of government protectionists, he pushed through a series of measures to encourage foreign investors to enter Spain. The success of the stabilization plan was miraculous. By 1963 Spain had $1.1 billion in foreign reserves and a booming economy."

References

Opus Dei members
1914 births
2001 deaths
Spanish economists